Bloodrock 3 is the third album by the Texan rock band Bloodrock, released on Capitol Records in 1971. 

The album debuted at No. 76 on the Billboard 200. It eventually achieved a Gold record certification.

Album cover
The album cover was designed by the band's producer, Terry Knight.

Critical reception
AllMusic wrote that "Bloodrock 3 is an effective hard rock album that boasts tight arrangements and a spirited performance by the band."

Track listing

Notes
The song "A Certain Kind" was originally performed by Soft Machine.

Credits
 Bloodrock:	Primary Artist
 Rick Cobb:	Composer, Drums, Percussion, Vocals
 Ed Grundy:	 Bass, Composer, Vocals
 Stephen Hill:	Keyboards, Vocals
 Hugh Hopper:	Composer
 Terry Knight:	Producer
 John Nitzinger:	Composer
 Lee Pickens:	 Guitar, Vocals
 Jim Rutledge:	 Composer, Vocals
 Nick Taylor:	Guitar, Guitar (Rhythm), Vocals

References

1971 albums
Bloodrock albums
Capitol Records albums
Albums produced by Terry Knight